Will Stein (born September 25, 1989) is an American football coach who is currently the offensive coordinator and quarterbacks coach at the University of Oregon. He previously served as the co-offensive coordinator and quarterbacks coach at the University of Texas at San Antonio (UTSA) in 2022.

Stein played college football at the University of Louisville as a quarterback from 2008 to 2012. Prior to his tenure at Oregon, he held various assistant coaching positions at the University of Louisville, University of Texas at Austin, Lake Travis High School and University of Texas at San Antonio (UTSA).

Playing career
Stein was a quarterback at Louisville from 2008 to 2012.

Career statistics

Coaching career

Louisville
After his playing career concluded, Stein stayed at Louisville as a graduate assistant and quality control coach from 2013 to 2014.

Texas
In 2015, Stein was named a quality control coach at Texas, joining his former college coach Charlie Strong and position coach Shawn Watson.

Lake Travis High School
Stein was the assistant head coach, offensive coordinator, and quarterbacks coach at Lake Travis High School in Texas from 2018 to 2019.

UTSA
On December 20, 2019, Stein was named the passing game coordinator and wide receivers coach at UTSA. He was promoted to co-offensive coordinator and quarterbacks coach on January 8, 2022.

Oregon
On December 5, 2022, Stein was named the offensive coordinator and quarterbacks coach at the University of Oregon under head coach Dan Lanning.

Personal life
Stein and his wife, Darby, have one son together.

References

External links
 
 Oregon profile
 UTSA profile
 Louisville profile

1989 births
Living people
American football quarterbacks
Louisville Cardinals football coaches
Louisville Cardinals football players
Oregon Ducks football coaches
Texas Longhorns football coaches
UTSA Roadrunners football coaches
High school football coaches in Texas
Coaches of American football from Kentucky
Players of American football from Louisville, Kentucky